Yornadaiyn (Donny) Woolagoodja (born 1947) is an Aboriginal Australian artist.  He is a member of the Worrorra people of the Kimberley area of Western Australia.

Career
Woolagoodja is the first chairman of the Mowanjum Artists Centre.
Woolagoodja's giant Wandjina artwork featured at the opening ceremony of the Sydney 2000 Olympic Games. Similar works were also featured at the 2016 Vivid Sydney festival's Lighting of the Sails celebration.

Personal
Donny Woolagoodja was born in 1947 at the Kunmunya Mission on the Kimberley coast, the son of Sam Woolagoodja.

Honours and awards
2021 Red Ochre Award - Australia Council for the Arts
2022 Adelaide Festival Awards for Literature Noniction Award, shortlisted

Publications

References

1947 births
Living people
Artists from Western Australia
Australian Aboriginal artists
People from the Kimberley (Western Australia)